RT-20 is the designation applied to two distinct military systems:

 RT-20 (missile), the Soviet missile
 RT-20 (rifle), the Croatian rifle